Ruskin Community High School is a coeducational comprehensive secondary school in Crewe, Cheshire, England, for pupils aged 11 to 16 years.

History

The school was founded in 1902 as Crewe County Secondary School in rooms at the then Technical College in Flag Lane and moved to the new Ruskin Road building in 1909. The name changed to Crewe County Grammar School after the 1944 Education Act. The last CCGS reunion was held in 2012 for pupils who entered the school in 1971 or 1972. When secondary education in Crewe was reorganised the school became the Ruskin County High School (and fully comprehensive) in 1978.  It achieved a Specialist Schools status in 2002 after a successful application to the Specialist Schools Trust and sufficient fund-raising.

Headteachers:

Mr D Postlethwaite (2019–Present)

Mrs E Brett (2009 – 2019)

Mr Mottershead (1994 - 2009)

Mr J.R. Munks (1974 - 1994)

Mr Lucas (1968 - 1974)

Mr Harold M. Dowling (1953 - 1967)

Mr Storey (1938 - 1942)

Mr D.H. McCurtain (1902 - 1938)

Recent developments
The school specialises in sport, and briefly modern foreign languages. The refurbished sports hall was opened in October 2005, whilst a new dining hall was completed in spring 2006. When the school was awarded Sports College Status, five floodlit tennis courts were built at a cost of almost £250,000.

Ruskin celebrated its centenary year on the Ruskin Road site in 2009. The celebrations officially began on Friday, 9 January 2009, with an assembly involving pupils and staff, ex-staff, ex-pupils and government officials. Assembly was followed by a tree planting service and concluded with a memorial service, during which a bench was dedicated to each of the three pupils who lost their lives while pupils at the school.

Alumni

Ruskin High, Crewe County Grammar School and CCGS for Boys
 Ian Butterworth, defender for Norwich City
 John Connor FRS FInstP, plasma physicist at the Culham Centre for Fusion Energy, who won the 2004 Hannes Alfvén Prize (European Physical Society)
 Alan Gibbons, children's author
 Norman Hughes, Olympic bronze medallist hockey player in the 1984 Olympics
 Mark Price, Baron Price, Managing Director from 2007-16 of Waitrose
 Colin Prophett, footballer
 Ian Sarson, Managing Director from 2010-13 of Compass Group UK & Ireland
 Chloe Lloyd, model
 David "Steve" Jones, DJ, musician and TV presenter

See also
 List of places in Cheshire
 List of schools in Cheshire East

References

Secondary schools in the Borough of Cheshire East
Educational institutions established in 1902
Crewe
1902 establishments in England
Community schools in the Borough of Cheshire East